is a 1975 Japanese yakuza film directed by Kinji Fukasaku. It won two Blue Ribbon Awards in 1976: Best Director (Fukasaku) and Best Actor (Sugawara). Complex named it number 6 on their list of The 25 Best Yakuza Movies. Kino International released the film on DVD in North America in 2006.

Plot
In the year 1963, in the fictional city of Kurashima, two yakuza gangs, once sub gangs for a more powerful family are competing for control of the city. They are the formerly Osaka-based Kawade family under Kasumi Kawade, and the Ohara family, under acting boss Kenji Hirotani. The former are allied to ex-boss and current city councilman Masaichi Tomoyasu; the latter have an alliance with the local police force.

After Ohara men raid one of Tomoyasu's bars for a hostess who worked for Hirotani before changing patrons and assigning the blame on a selected Ohara member, Detective Tokomatsu Kuno obtains information on an illegal land auction deal involving the Kawade, Tomoyasu, and the local oil company, Nikko Oil. Acting on this information, Hirotani leaks details of the deal. The land auction is put on hold, and Hirotani manages to gain control of it. He offers to sell it back to Nikko Oil executive Kubo for a price, but the latter refuses. Elsewhere, Ohara members and their police friends get into a fight with a truck driver, who is revealed to have been working for Kawade. He uses this a pretext for an all-out gang war against Hirotani.

With the war in full swing, Kawade, Tomoyasu, and Kubo meet with Police Commissioner Kikkuchi. Kikkuchi has crusading Lieutenant Shoichi Kaida assigned to lead the crackdown against the Ohara family. Kaida sets about ordering the officers - Kuno included - to stop fraternizing with the yakuza, and makes his point by smashing bottles of sake Hirotani had sent to the police one night. Yoshihura, one of the officers under Tomoyasu's payroll, gets into a fight with Kaida, resigns, and joins Tomoyasu's law office.

As the war progresses, Boss Ohara is released from jail. Elsewhere, Hirotani is angered with Kuno when he and his men are no longer being tipped off on upcoming police raids. After a raid at Ohara family headquarters, Boss Ohara is taken in for questioning, and under the advice of Tomoyasu (his sworn brother from years before), agrees to retire permanently, disband his family, and surrender all his rackets to Boss Kawade. Kuno meanwhile lets one of Hirotani's men (one had met at the film's beginning), go free. The man is arrested later however, and he believes Kuno had sold him out. Kuno gets into an argument with Kaida over how they should properly deal with the gangs. Kubo believes working with the gangs is better for the city at large.  He gets suspended after picking a fight with Kaida.

Depserate to gain revenge against Kawade and Tomoyasu, Hirotani and his remaining men kidnap Yoshihura and hold him hostage just as Hirotani's arrest warrant arrives. The police mobilize and attempt to besiege the hotel, but all attempts to convince Hirotani to surrender are unsuccessful. Kawamoto, a friend of Hirotani's right-hand man Tsukahara, is killed after unsuccessfully asking Tsukahara to negotiate in Hirotani's place.  Kuno is then recalled to defuse the situation, and he manages to infiltrate the hotel, rescue Yoshihura, and subdue Hirotani after the hotel is tear-gassed. Kuno then arranges a deal with Kaida in exchange for Hirotani: the Kawade family will be disbanded, Hirotani and Tsukahara will be given light prison sentences, and Kaida will admit that Kuno was correct about how to deal with the gang. If he refuses, he will leave and threaten to expose the corrupt officers in the police force, himself included.

Kaida accepts the deal and Hirotani has his men surrender themselves and their weapons. As they give themselves up, Hirotani asks Kuno to remove his cuffs, and he obliges. After he is led out, Hirotani breaks free and attempts to take Kaida hostage with Tsukahara. After a tense standoff, Kuno pulls out his pistol and shoots Hirotani several times, killing him. An epilogue states that Kaida resigned from the force two years later and took up a position with Nikko Oil. Kuno meanwhile had been transferred to another city as a patrolman. One night after the end of his shift, he comes upon a crashed car at the exit of a tunnel whilst being followed by a truck. When the truck catches up with him and refuses to obey his signals, it runs over and kills him.

Cast

Bunta Sugawara as Tokumatsu Kuno
Hiroki Matsukata as Kenji Hirotani
Mikio Narita as Katsumi Kawade
Tatsuo Umemiya as Shoichi Kaida
Hideo Murota as Tsukahara
Shingo Yamashiro as Yasuo Kawamoto
Reiko Ike as Mariko
Jūkei Fujioka as Ikeda
Asao Sano as Yusaku Yoshiura
Nobuo Kaneko as Masaichi Tomoyasu
Harumi Sone as Kyuichi Okimoto
Takuzo Kawatani as Taku Matsui
Tatsuo Endō as Takeo Ohara
Kunie Tanaka as Kinpachi Komiya
Toru Abe as Azuma Kikuchi
Akira Shioji as Chujiro Shiota
Shotaro Hayashi as Shimodera
Masaharu Arikawa as Tokuda
Sanae Nakahara as Reiko
Yoko Koizumi as Yuri
Maki Tachibana as Kasumi
Keiko Yumi as Miya
Midori Shirai as Chiyomi
Masako Matsumoto as Mitsuyo
Gentaro Mori as Tanpo

Production
Tetsuya Watari was originally set to play Hirotani, but had to step down due to illness. The role then went to Hiroki Matsukata.

References

External links
 

1975 films
Films directed by Kinji Fukasaku
Japanese neo-noir films
Yakuza films
Toei Company films
Films set in 1963
1970s Japanese films